Jaya Suriya Engineering College is an engineering college, located in Koduveli, Chennai, Tamil Nadu, India. the college offers five undergraduate programs in engineering and technology.

History
Jaya Suriya Engineering College was established by RKR Educational Trust in 2010. The founder and chairman is K. Govindarajan. The college is affiliated with Anna University, Chennai and approved by the All India Council for Technical Education (AICTE).

Courses offered
Under Graduate Courses
 Computer Science and Engineering
 Electronics and Communication Engineering
 Electrical and Electronics Engineering
 Civil Engineering
 Mechanical Engineering

References

External links
 

Engineering colleges in Chennai
Colleges affiliated to Anna University
Educational institutions established in 2010
2010 establishments in Tamil Nadu